The mountains of Enderby Land are located in the region Enderby Land, East Antarctica, between 45° E and 55° E. Australia claims this region to be part of the Australian Antarctic Territory. The area are highly glaciated. The availability of reliable data for this region is limited, making the list incomplete and inaccurate. The highest peaks, including nunataks and ice domes, are listed below:

See also
 Geology of Enderby Land
 Mount Boda

References 

 
Enderby Land
mountains